William Neilson Dairy Limited is a Canadian dairy company owned by Saputo Inc. The company is based in Toronto, Ontario. In the United States, its products are sold under the name Neilson.

Its products are sold at Loblaws, Real Canadian Superstore, Giant Tiger, and Fortinos, among others.

History
The company was founded by William Neilson (1844–1915) in 1893 as one of many independent dairy producers in Canada. Neilsons began as a milk retailer, and then switched to cream and ice cream products. 

Neilson Dairy became William Neilson Limited in 1907. After the mid-20th century, many smaller companies were taken over by larger corporations. William Neilson was sold to George Weston Limited in 1947. 

Neilson Dairy became part of the Saputo corporate group after George Weston Limited sold the dairy unit in 2008.

Products
A list of brands and products sold by Neilson Dairy past and present:

 Neilson dairy products including, milk, butter, ice cream and instant puddings.
 Häagen-Dazs ice cream licence – acquired in 1981, sold to Ault Foods in 1990.
 Cadbury Confectionery Company Canadian operations – acquired in 1987, sold all confectionery and chocolate products back to British Cadbury in 1996. Neilson licenses Caramilk and Crispy Crunch-flavoured chocolate milk.
 Chocolate bars and confectionery – Jersey Milk, Mr. Big, Malted Milk, Sweet Marie and Crispy Crunch (for which the recipe was changed), Pep, Will-O-Pak sold to British Cadbury in 1996. Jersey Milk and Will-O-Paks continue to have the Neilson brand name on them; however, they are now manufactured by Mondelez Canada.
 Bite-size chocolates – Neilson sells several varieties of chocolate snacks, including Golden Buds, small milk chocolates similar to Hershey's Kisses; Slowpokes, similar to Turtles; and Willocrisp, flaky peanut wafers dipped in chocolate, similar to Crispy Crunch.

Operations
Neilson dairy operations past and present:

 Beachville, Ontario – former cheese operations (closed)
 Georgetown, Ontario
 Guelph, Ontario – formerly Royal Dairy (closed)
 Ottawa, Ontario – formerly Clark Dairy
 Toronto, Ontario – formerly Donlands Dairy and Neilson-Cadbury chocolate factory – sold
 Montreal, Quebec
 Barrie, Ontario

References

External links
 

Companies based in Toronto
Food and drink companies established in 1893
Canadian chocolate companies
Dairy products companies of Canada
1893 establishments in Ontario
Canadian companies established in 1893